Rake is a software task management and build automation tool created by Jim Weirich. It allows the user to specify tasks and describe dependencies as well as to group tasks in a namespace. It is similar in to SCons and Make. It's written in the Ruby programming language and the Rakefiles (equivalent of Makefiles in Make) use Ruby syntax. Rake uses Ruby's anonymous function blocks to define various tasks, allowing the use of Ruby syntax. It has a library of common tasks: for example, functions to do common file-manipulation tasks and a library to remove compiled files (the "clean" task). Like Make, Rake can also synthesize tasks based on patterns: for example, automatically building a file compilation task based on filename patterns. Rake is now part of the standard library of Ruby from version 1.9 onward.

Example
Below is an example of a simple Rake script to build a C Hello World program.
file 'hello.o' => 'hello.c' do
  sh 'cc -c -o hello.o hello.c'
end
file 'hello' => 'hello.o' do
  sh 'cc -o hello hello.o'
end

Rules

When a file is named as a prerequisite but it does not have a file task defined for it, Rake will attempt to synthesize a task by looking at a list of rules supplied in the Rakefile. For example, suppose we were trying to invoke task "mycode.o" with no tasks defined for it. If the Rakefile has a rule that looks like this:

rule '.o' => '.c' do |t|
  sh "cc #{t.source} -c -o #{t.name}"
end

This rule will synthesize any task that ends in ".o". It has as a prerequisite that a source file with an extension of ".c" must exist. If Rake is able to find a file named "mycode.c", it will automatically create a task that builds "mycode.o" from "mycode.c". If the file "mycode.c" does not exist, Rake will attempt to recursively synthesize a rule for it.

When a task is synthesized from a rule, the source attribute of the task is set to the matching source file. This allows users to write rules with actions that reference the source file.

Advanced rules

Any regular expression may be used as the rule pattern. Additionally, a proc may be used to calculate the name of the source file. This allows for complex patterns and sources.

The following rule is equivalent to the example above:

rule(/\.o$/ =>
  ->(t_name){ t_name.sub /\.o$/, '.c' }) do |t|
  sh "cc #{t.source} -c -o #{t.name}"
end

NOTE: Because of a quirk in Ruby syntax, parentheses are required around a rule when the first argument is a regular expression.

The following rule might be used for Java files:

rule '.class' => ->(t_name){ t_name
    .sub(/\.class$/, '.java')
    .sub(/^classes\//, 'src/') } do |t|
  java_compile(t.source, t.name)
end

Below is an example of a simple Rake recipe:

namespace :cake do
  desc 'make pancakes'
  task :pancake => [:flour,:milk,:egg,:baking_powder] do
     puts "sizzle"
  end
  task :butter do
    puts "cut 3 tablespoons of butter into tiny squares"
  end
  task :flour => :butter do
    puts "use hands to knead butter squares into 1 1/2 cup flour"
  end
  task :milk do
    puts "add 1 1/4 cup milk"
  end
  task :egg do
   puts "add 1 egg"
  end
  task :baking_powder do
   puts "add 3 1/2 teaspoons baking powder"
  end
end

See also

 Make
 Apache Maven
 Apache Ant

External links 
 Rake documentation
 
 Using the Rake build language by Martin Fowler
 Ruby on Rails Rake tutorial at railsenvy.com
 Custom Rake Tasks at railscasts.com
 Rake Tutorial at lukaszwrobel.pl

Programming tools
Build automation
Software using the MIT license
Ruby (programming language)